Lionel Vuibert (born 31 August 1968
in Villers-Semeuse, Ardennes)
is a French politician. He is the deputy for Ardennes's 1st constituency in the National Assembly of France, elected
in the 2022 French legislative election, and is a member of Agir.

He was Mayor of Faissault from 2008, he announced that he is leaving his post as mayor as a result of his election as deputy.

External Links

 His page on the site of the National Assembly

References

Living people
1968 births
Agir (France) politicians
21st-century French politicians
Deputies of the 16th National Assembly of the French Fifth Republic
Mayors of places in France